Netishyn is a city in Shepetivka Raion of Khmelnytskyi Oblast (province), in the west of Ukraine. It is located on the Horyn River. Netishyn hosts the administration of Netishyn urban hromada, one of the hromadas of Ukraine. Population: 

Netishyn is the site of the Khmelnytskyi Nuclear Power Plant.

Until 18 July 2020, Netishyn was incorporated as a city of oblast significance and did not belong to the raion. In July 2020, as part of the administrative reform of Ukraine, which reduced the number of raions of Khmelnytskyi Oblast to three, the city of Netishyn was merged into Shepetivka Raion.

History

Notable people of Netishyn 
 Alina Komashchuk — champion fencer
 Dariya Nedashkovska — fencer
 Olha Zhovnir — champion fencer
 Halyna Pundyk — champion fencer
 Valeriy Fedorchuk — footballer

Gallery

References

External links 

Cities in Khmelnytskyi Oblast
Volhynian Governorate
Socialist planned cities